Mamianiella coryli is a plant pathogen.

References

External links 
 Index Fungorum
 USDA ARS Fungal Database

Gnomoniaceae
Fungal plant pathogens and diseases